Morgan House Kalimpong or Morgan House is a mansion of British colonial architecture built by an English jute baron George Morgan in the 1930s on the hill station of Kalimpong, Kalimpong district, West Bengal. Today, the mansion is a hotel managed by West Bengal Tourism Development Corporation (WBTDC). Earlier this property was also known as Singamari Tourist Lodge or Durpin Tourist Lodge.

Location 
Morgan House is built on a sixteen-acre estate atop the mountain of Durpindara. It is situated three kilometers off the center of Kalimpong town and has a clear view of the Kangchenjunga mountain range. The mansion and the estate is surrounded by the Kalimpong Cantonment area and overlooks the valleys of Relli, Kapher, Deolo and Labha in various directions.

Morgan House is 75 km from Siliguri, 52 km from Darjeeling and 75 km from Gangtok by road. Nearest railway station is in New Jalpaiguri and nearest airport is in Pakyong.

History 
Morgan house is a British colonial mansion built in the early 1930s. The building was to commemorate the wedding of an indigo plantation owner with a jute baron George Morgan.

The property was used as a summer retreat and elaborate parties were hosted. It passed into the hand of trustees after the Morgans died without heir. It was further handed over to government of India post Indian independence. During 1962, after then prime minister Jawahar Lal Nehru was taken ill, plans were made to convert this house into a government rest house.

However, due to sudden demise of Jawahar Lal Nehru, this plan was abandoned. In 1965 it was handed to tourism department and in 1975 it was finally handed over to West Bengal Tourism Development Corporation. Since then it is being managed as a boutique hotel and is open to tourists.

Popular culture 
Indian actors and celebrities such as Uttam Kumar, Supriya, Kishore Kumar, Amit Kumar, Leena Chandavarkar, Nargis, Sunil Dutt and Om Prakash have stayed in this lodge and their testimonials can be seen framed in the lounge. Actor Utpal Dutt was also a regular visitor. American ambassador in India Chester Bowles stayed here.

This lodge is also considered to be haunted and has been featured in several lists of haunted lodges and hotels.

Gallery

See also 
 Kalimpong town
 Kalimpong district
 Durpin Hill
 Deolo
 West Bengal Tourism Development Corporation

References

Bibliography

External links 
 https://www.wbtdcl.com/home/lodge_search?Lodge_id=OA&Lodge_destinationName=Mw
 
 
 http://kaluk.in/wbtdc_kalimpong_morgan_house.html

British colonial architecture in India
Tourist attractions in Kalimpong district
Houses in India
Reportedly haunted locations in India
Superstitions of India
Houses completed in the 20th century
1930s establishments in British India
20th-century architecture in India